Piano Portraits by Phineas Newborn is an album by American jazz pianist Phineas Newborn Jr. recorded in 1959 and released on the Roulette label.

Reception
The Allmusic site awarded the album 4 stars.

Track listing
 "Star Eyes" (Gene de Paul, Don Raye) – 2:58
 "Golden Earrings" (Jay Livingston, Jay Evans, Victor Young) – 3:21
 "It's All Right With Me" (Cole Porter) – 3:57
 "I Can't Get Started" (Vernon Duke, Ira Gershwin) – 3:56
 "Sweet and Lovely" (Gus Arnheim, Jules LeMare, Harry Tobias) – 3:34
 "Just in Time" (Jule Styne, Betty Comden, Adolph Green) – 2:25
 "Caravan" (Duke Ellington, Irving Mills, Juan Tizol) – 3:43
 "For All We Know" (J. Fred Coots, Sam M. Lewis) – 4:14
 "(Blues Theme) For Left Hand Only" (Phineas Newborn Jr.) – 4:05
 "Chelsea Bridge" (Billy Strayhorn) – 3:45		  
Recorded in New York City on June 17 (tracks 5 & 8) and June 18 (tracks 1–4, 6, 7, 9 & 10), 1959

Personnel
Phineas Newborn Jr. – piano
John Simmons – bass
Roy Haynes – drums

References

Roulette Records albums
Phineas Newborn Jr. albums
1959 albums